MTV Pilipinas Music Awards was the MTV Pilipinas' annual music video awards event.

Award categories
Video of the Year
Favorite Male Video
Favorite Female Video
Favorite New Artist in a Video
Favorite Group Video
Favorite Indie Video
Favorite International Video
Best Animated Video
Best Director

Defunct categories
Favorite Song
Favorite International Act1

1 The only recipient of this category is Maroon 5 for their video This Love in 2004.

Best Animated Video
The following is a list of MTV Pilipinas winners for Best Animated Video. The category is one of the seven that were added in 2006 along with Favorite Pop Video, Favorite Hip-Hop and R&B Video, Favorite Rock Video, Best Cinematography in a Video, Best Editing in a Video and Best Production Design in a Video.

Special awards

1 Presented by Juicy Fruit.
² Presented by Smart Buddy.
³ Presented by SMB Play.

Host city

Records
The artist with the most awards of the same category is Rivermaya for Favorite Group Video in 2002 (Umaaraw, Umuulan), 2003 (Wag Na Init Ulo Baby), 2005 (You'll Be Safe Here) and 2006 (Sunday Driving).
The video with the most awards in one night is Sandwich's Sugod in 2006 with four categories won: Video of the Year, Best Editing in a Video, Best Production Design in a Video and Best Director.

See also
 MTV Asia Awards

References

External links
 MTV Philippines official site
 MTV Pilipinas 2006 official voting site
 MTV Pilipinas 2003 article
 MTV Pilipinas 2004 article
 MTV Pilipinas 2005 Titik Pilipino article

Philippine music awards
Music video awards
MTV Pilipinas Music Awards
2006 establishments in the Philippines